Manitoba Provincial Road 209 (PR 209) is a short provincial road in Manitoba, Canada.

Route description
It is a paved, two-lane road.

Prior to 1992, PR 209 extended west from PTH 59 to PR 218 near Ridgeville and then southeast to PR 200 near Emerson.  Part of this former section was reassigned to PR 218; the remainder is a municipal road.

References

External links
Official Manitoba Highway Map

209